Nangal Jamalpur is a village in Jalandhar - I in Jalandhar district of Punjab State, India. The village is administrated by Sarpanch an elected representative of the village.

Demography 
, the village has 115 houses and a population of 532 of which 295 are males and 237 are females.  According to the report published by Census India in 2011, of the village population, 319 people are from Schedule Caste and the village does not have any Scheduled Tribe population.

See also
List of villages in India

References

External links 
 Tourism of Punjab
 Census of Punjab

Villages in Jalandhar district